Montreal Lake is a lake in the Lake Superior drainage basin in Sudbury District, Ontario, Canada, and the source of the Montreal River. The primary outflow, at the east, is the Montreal River, which flows to Lake Superior at Montreal River Harbour.

References

Lakes of Sudbury District